City'us Târgu Mureş was a futsal club based in Târgu Mureş, Romania. The club was dissolved in 2018 due to financial problems.

Achievements 
Liga I: 2010, 2011, 2012, 2013, 2015, 2016
Romanian Futsal Cup:  2008, 2009, 2010, 2011, 2012, 2013, 2014
Romanian Super Cup: 2010

References

External links
Official Website

Futsal clubs in Romania
Futsal clubs established in 2004
Sports clubs disestablished in 2018
2004 establishments in Romania
2018 disestablishments in Romania